Hubei (alternately Hupeh) is a landlocked province of the People's Republic of China, and is part of the Central China region. The name of the province means "north of the lake", referring to its position north of Dongting Lake. The provincial capital, Wuhan, serves as a major transportation hub and the political, cultural, and economic hub of central China.

Hubei's name is officially abbreviated to "", an ancient name associated with the eastern part of the province since the State of E of the Western Zhou dynasty of –771 BCE; a popular name for Hubei is "" (suggested by that of the powerful State of Chu, which existed in the area during the Eastern Zhou dynasty of 770 – 256 BCE). Hubei borders the provinces of Henan to the north, Anhui to the east, Jiangxi to the southeast, Hunan to the south, Chongqing to the west, and Shaanxi to the northwest. The high-profile Three Gorges Dam is located at Yichang, in the west of the province.

Hubei is the 7th-largest provincial economy of China, the second largest in the Central China region, the third largest in the South Central China region and the third largest among inland provinces. , Hubei's nominal GDP was US$ 787 billion (CNY 5 trillion) and its GDP (nominal) per capita exceeded US$13,000, making it the richest landlocked province, the richest province in the Central China region, and 2nd richest province in South Central China region after Guangdong.

History 

The Hubei region was home to sophisticated Neolithic cultures. By the Spring and Autumn period (770–476 BC), the territory of today's Hubei formed part of the powerful State of Chu. Chu, nominally a tributary state of the Zhou dynasty, was itself an extension of the Chinese civilization that had emerged some centuries before in the north; but it was also a culturally unique blend of northern and southern culture, and developed into a powerful state that controlled much of the middle and lower Yangtze River, with power extending northwards into the North China Plain.

During the Warring States period (475–221 BC) Chu became the major adversary of the upstart State of Qin to the northwest (in present-day Guanzhong, Shaanxi province), which began to assert itself by outward expansionism. As wars between Qin and Chu ensued, Chu lost more and more land: first its dominance over the Sichuan Basin, then (in 278 BC) its heartland, which correspond to modern Hubei. In 223 BC Qin chased down the remnants of the Chu regime, which had fled eastwards during Qin's wars of uniting China.

Qin founded the Qin dynasty in 221 BC, the first unified dynasty in China. The Qin dynasty was succeeded in 206 BC by the Han dynasty , which established the province (zhou) of Jingzhou in today's Hubei and Hunan. The Qin and Han played an active role in the extension of farmland in Hubei, maintaining a system of river dikes to protect farms from summer floods. Towards the end of the Eastern Han dynasty in the beginning of the 3rd century, Jingzhou was ruled by regional warlord Liu Biao. After his death in 208, Liu Biao's realm was surrendered by his successors to Cao Cao, a powerful warlord who had conquered nearly all of north China; but in the Battle of Red Cliffs (208 or 209), warlords Liu Bei and Sun Quan drove Cao Cao out of Jingzhou. Liu Bei then took control of Jingzhou and appointed Guan Yu as administrator of Xiangyang (in modern Xiangyang, Hubei) to guard Jing province; he went on to conquer Yizhou (the Sichuan Basin), but lost Jingzhou to Sun Quan; for the next few decades Jingzhou was controlled by the Wu Kingdom, ruled by Sun Quan and his successors.

The incursion of northern nomadic peoples into the region at the beginning of the 4th century (Five Barbarians' rebellion and Disaster of Yongjia
(永嘉之乱)) began nearly three centuries of division into a nomad-ruled (but increasingly Sinicized) north and a Han Chinese-ruled south. Hubei, to the south, remained under southern rule for this entire period, until the unification of China by the Sui dynasty in 589. In 617 the Tang dynasty replaced Sui, and later on the Tang dynasty placed present-day Hubei under the jurisdiction of several circuits: Jiangnanxi Circuit in the south; Shannandong Circuit (山南东道) in the west, and Huainan Circuit in the east. After the Tang dynasty disintegrated in the early 10th century, Hubei came under the control of several regional regimes: Jingnan in the center, Yang Wu and its successor Southern Tang to the east, the Five Dynasties to the north and Shu to Shizhou (施州, in modern Enshi, Enshi Tujia and Miao Autonomous Prefecture).

The Song dynasty reunified the region in 982 and placed most of Hubei into Jinghubei Circuit, a longer version of Hubei's current name. Mongols conquered the region in 1279, and under their rule the province of Huguang was established, covering Hubei, Hunan, and parts of Guangdong and Guangxi. During the Mongol rule, in 1331, Hubei was devastated by an outbreak of the Black Death, which reached England, Belgium, and Italy by June 1348, and which, according to Chinese sources, spread during the following three centuries to decimate populations throughout Eurasia.

The Ming dynasty (1368-1644) drove out the Mongols in 1368. Their version of Huguang province was smaller, and corresponded almost entirely to the modern provinces of Hubei and Hunan combined. Hubei lay geographically outside the centers of the Ming power. During the last years of the Ming, today's Hubei was ravaged several times by the rebel armies of Zhang Xianzhong and Li Zicheng. The Manchu Qing dynasty which took control of much of the region in 1644, soon split Huguang into the modern provinces of Hubei and Hunan. The Qing dynasty, however, continued to maintain a Viceroy of Huguang, one of the most well-known viceroys being Zhang Zhidong (in office between 1889 and 1907), whose modernizing reforms made Hubei (especially Wuhan) into a prosperous center of commerce and industry. The Huangshi/Daye area, south-east of Wuhan, became an important center of mining and metallurgy.

In 1911 the Wuchang Uprising took place in modern-day Wuhan. The uprising started the Xinhai Revolution, which overthrew the Qing dynasty and established the Republic of China. In 1927 Wuhan became the seat of a government established by left-wing elements of the Kuomintang, led by Wang Jingwei; this government later merged into Chiang Kai-shek's government in Nanjing. During World War II the eastern parts of Hubei were conquered and occupied by Japan, while the western parts remained under Chinese control.

During the Cultural Revolution in the 1960s, Wuhan saw fighting between rival Red Guard factions. In July 1967, civil strife struck the city in the Wuhan Incident ("July 20th Incident"), an armed conflict between two hostile groups who were fighting for control over the city at the height of the Cultural Revolution.

As the fears of a nuclear war increased during the time of Sino-Soviet border conflicts in the late 1960s, the Xianning prefecture of Hubei was chosen as the site of Project 131, an underground military-command headquarters.

The province—and Wuhan in particular—suffered severely from the 1954 Yangtze River Floods. Large-scale dam construction followed, with the Gezhouba Dam on the Yangtze River near Yichang started in 1970 and completed in 1988; the construction of the Three Gorges Dam, further upstream, began in 1993. In the following years, authorities resettled millions of people from western Hubei to make way for the construction of the dam. A number of smaller dams have been constructed on the Yangtze's tributaries as well.

The Xianning Nuclear Power Plant is planned in Dafanzhen, Tongshan County, Xianning, to host at least four 1,250-megawatt (MW) AP1000 pressurized-water reactors.
Work on the site began in 2010; plans envisaged that the first reactor would start construction in 2011 and go online in 2015. However, construction of the first phase had yet to start .

On 1 December 2019, the first case of COVID-19 in the COVID-19 pandemic was identified in the city of Wuhan. In January 2020, the SARS-CoV-2 virus was officially identified, leading local and federal governments to implement massive quarantine zones across Hubei province, especially in the capital Wuhan (the epicenter of the outbreak). Authorities partially or fully locked down 15 cities, directly affecting 57 million people. Following severe outbreaks in numerous other countries, including in different areas of the world, the World Health Organization declared the COVID-19 a pandemic in March 2020. However, after more than eight weeks, the lockdown on most cities in the province was lifted.

Geography 

The Jianghan Plain takes up most of central and southern Hubei, while the west and the peripheries are more mountainous, with ranges such as the Wudang Mountains, the Jing Mountains, the Daba Mountains, and the Wu Mountains (in rough north-to-south order). The Dabie Mountains lie to the northeast of the Jianghan Plain, on the border with Henan and Anhui; the Tongbai Mountains lie to the north on the border with Henan; to the southeast, the Mufu Mountains form the border with Jiangxi. The highest peak in Hubei is Shennong Peak, found in the Daba Mountains of the forestry area of Shennongjia; it has an altitude of 3105 m.

The two major rivers of Hubei are the Yangtze River and its left tributary, the Han River; they lend their names to the Jianghan Plain – Jiang representing the Yangtze and han representing the Han River. The Yangtze River enters Hubei from the west via the Three Gorges; the eastern half of the Three Gorges (Xiling Gorge and part of Wu Gorge) lie in western Hubei, while the western half is in neighbouring Chongqing. The Han River enters the province from the northwest. After crossing most of the province, the two great rivers meet at the center of Wuhan, the provincial capital.

Among the notable tributaries of the Yangtze within the province are the Shen Nong Stream (a small northern tributary, severely affected by the Three Gorges Dam project); the Qing, a major waterway of southwestern Hubei; the Huangbo near Yichang; and the Fushui River in the southeast.

Thousands of lakes dot the landscape of Hubei's Jianghan Plain, giving Hubei the name of "Province of Lakes"; the largest of these lakes are Liangzi Lake and Hong Lake. The numerous hydrodams have created a number of large reservoirs, the largest of which is the Danjiangkou Reservoir on the Han River, on the border between Hubei and Henan.

Hubei has a humid subtropical climate (Cfa or Cwa under the Köppen climate classification), with four distinct seasons. The mountainous districts of western Hubei, in particular Shennongjia, with their cooler summers, attract numerous visitors from Wuhan and other lowland cities.

Besides the capital Wuhan, other important cities are Jingmen; Shiyan, a center of automotive industry and the gateway to the Wudang Mountains; Yichang, the main base for the gigantic hydroelectric projects of southwestern Hubei; and Shashi.

Administrative divisions

Hubei is divided into seventeen prefecture-level divisions (of which there are twelve prefecture-level cities (including a sub-provincial city) and one autonomous prefecture), as well as three directly administered county-level cities (all sub-prefecture-level cities) and one directly administered county-level forestry area. At the end of 2017, the total population is 59.02 million.

The thirteen Prefecture and four directly administered county-level divisions of Hubei are subdivided into 103 county-level divisions (39 districts, 24 county-level cities, 37 counties, 2 autonomous counties, 1 forestry district; the directly administered county-level divisions are included here). Those are in turn divided into 1234 township-level divisions (737 towns, 215 townships, nine ethnic townships, and 273 subdistricts).

Urban areas

Government and politics

Secretaries of the Chinese Communist Party Hubei Committee:
Li Xiannian: 1949−1954
Wang Renzhong: 1954−1966
Zhang Tixue: 1966−1967
Zeng Siyu: 1970−1973
Zhao Xinchu: 1973−1978
Chen Pixian: 1978−1982
Guan Guangfu: 1983−1994
Jia Zhijie: 1994−2001
Jiang Zhuping: 2001
Yu Zhengsheng: 2001−2007
Luo Qingquan: 2007−2011
Li Hongzhong: 2011−2016
Jiang Chaoliang: 2016−2020
Ying Yong: 2020−2022
Wang Menghui: 2022- present

Governors of Hubei:
Li Xiannian: 1949−1954
Liu Zihou: 1954−1956
Zhang Tixue: 1956−1967
Zeng Siyu: 1968−1973
Zhao Xinchu: 1973−1978
Chen Pixian: 1978−1980
Han Ningfu: 1980−1982
Huang Zhizhen: 1982−1986
Guo Zhenqian: 1986−1990
Guo Shuyan: 1990−1993
Jia Zhijie: 1993−1995
Jiang Zhuping: 1995−2001
Zhang Guoguang: 2001−2002
Luo Qingquan: 2002−2007
Li Hongzhong: 2007−2010
Wang Guosheng: 2010−2016
Wang Xiaodong: 2016−2021
Wang Zhonglin: 2021−present

Economy 

Hubei is often called the "Land of Fish and Rice". Important agricultural products in Hubei include cotton, rice, wheat, and tea, while industries include automobiles, metallurgy, machinery, power generation, textiles, foodstuffs and high-tech commodities.

Mineral resources that can be found in Hubei in significant quantities include borax, hongshiite, wollastonite, garnet, marlstone, iron, phosphorus, copper, gypsum, rutile, rock salt, gold amalgam, manganese and vanadium. The province's recoverable reserves of coal stand at 548 million tons, which is modest compared to other Chinese provinces. Hubei is well known for its mines of fine turquoise and green faustite.

Once completed, the Three Gorges Dam in western Hubei will provide plentiful hydroelectricity, with an estimated annual power production of 84,700 Gwh. Existing hydroelectric stations include Gezhouba, Danjiangkou, Geheyan, Hanjiang, Duhe, Huanglongtan, Bailianhe, Lushui and Fushui.

Hubei is the 7th-largest provincial economy of China, the second largest in the Central China region after Henan, the third largest in the South Central China region after Guangdong and Henan and the third largest among inland provinces after Henan and Sichuan. , Hubei's nominal GDP was US$ 787 billion (CNY 5 trillion). Its GDP (nominal) per capita exceeded US$13,000, making it the richest landlocked province, the richest province in the Central China region, and 2nd richest province in South Central China region after Guangdong.

Economic and Technological Development Zones
 Hubei Jingzhou Chengnan Economic Development Zone was established in 1992 under the approval of Hubei Government. Three major industries include textile, petroleum and chemical processing, with a combined output accounts for 90% of its total output.
 Wuhan East Lake High-Tech Development Zone is a national level high-tech development zone. Optical-electronics, telecommunications, and equipment manufacturing are the core industries of Wuhan East Lake High-Tech Development Zone (ELHTZ) while software outsourcing and electronics are also encouraged. ELHTZ is China's largest production centre for optical-electronic products with key players like Changfei Fiber-optical Cables (the largest fiber-optical cable maker in China), Fenghuo Telecommunications and Wuhan Research Institute of Post and Telecommunications (the largest research institute in optical telecommunications in China). Wuhan ELHTZ represents the development centre for China's laser industry with key players such as HUST Technologies and Chutian Laser being based in the zone.
 Wuhan Economic and Technological Development Zone is a national level industrial zone incorporated in 1993. Its size is about 10-25 square km and it plans to expand to 25-50 square km. Industries encouraged in Wuhan Economic and Technological Development Zone include automobile production/assembly, biotechnology/pharmaceuticals, chemicals production and processing, food/beverage processing, heavy industry, and telecommunications equipment.
 Wuhan Export Processing Zone was established in 2000. The first  area has been launched.
 Wuhan Optical Valley (Guanggu) Software Park is in Wuhan East Lake High-Tech Development Zone.
 Xiangyang New & Hi-Tech Industrial Development Zone

Demographics 

Han Chinese form the dominant ethnic group in Hubei. A considerable Miao and Tujia population live in the southwestern part of the province, especially in Enshi Tujia and Miao Autonomous Prefecture.

On October 18, 2009, Chinese officials began to relocate 330,000 residents from the Hubei and Henan provinces that will be affected by the Danjiangkou Reservoir on the Han river. The reservoir is part of the larger South-North Water Transfer Project.

Religion 

The predominant religions in Hubei are Chinese folk religions, Taoist traditions and Chinese Buddhism. According to surveys conducted in 2007 and 2009, 6.5% of the population believes and is involved in cults of ancestors, while 0.58% of the population identifies as Christian, declining from 0.83% in 2004. The reports did not give figures for other types of religion; 92.92% of the population may be either irreligious or involved in worship of nature deities, Buddhism, Confucianism, Taoism, folk religious sects.

Culture 

People in Hubei speak Mandarin dialects; most of these dialects are classified as Southwestern Mandarin dialects, a group that also encompasses the Mandarin dialects of most of southwestern China.

Perhaps the most celebrated element of Hubei cuisine is the Wuchang bream, a freshwater bream that is commonly steamed.

Types of traditional Chinese opera popular in Hubei include Hanju and Chuju.

The Shennongjia area is the alleged home of the Yeren, a wild undiscovered hominid that lives in the forested hills.

The people of Hubei are given the uncomplimentary nickname "Nine-headed Birds" by other Chinese, from a mythological creature said to be very aggressive and hard to kill. "In the sky live nine-headed birds. On the earth live Hubei people."

Wuhan is one of the major culture centers in China.

Hubei is thought to be the province that originated the card game of dou dizhu.

Education
As of 2022, Hubei hosts 130 institutions of higher education, ranking sixth together with Hunan (130) among all Chinese provinces after Jiangsu (168), Guangdong (160), Henan (156), Shandong (153), and Sichuan (134). The Huazhong University of Science and Technology(HUST), Wuhan University and many other institutions in Wuhan make it a hub of higher education and research in China. Wuhan is the city that has the largest college student population in the world (1.3 million) studying in its 89 universities.

Universities 

 Huazhong University of Science and Technology
 Wuhan University
 Central China Normal University (Huazhong Normal University)
 Wuhan University of Technology
 Huazhong Agricultural University
 Hubei University of Technology
 Zhongnan University of Economics and Law
 China University of Geosciences
 Jianghan University
 Hubei University
 Hubei University of Economics
 Hubei University of Education
 China Three Gorges University (yichang)
 Wuhan Institute of Technology
 Wuhan University of Science and Technology
 Yangtze University
 South-Central University for Nationalities
 Hubei Institute of Fine Arts
 Wuhan Technology and Business University
 Wuhan Technical College of Communications

Transportation 

Prior to the construction of China's national railway network, the Yangtze and Hanshui Rivers had been the main transportation arteries of Hubei for many centuries, and still continue to play an important transport role.

Historically, Hubei's overland transport network was hampered by the lack of bridges across the Yangtze River, which divides the province into northern and southern regions. The first bridge across the Yangtze in Hubei, the Wuhan Yangtze River Bridge was completed in 1957, followed by the Zhicheng Bridge in 1971. , Hubei had 23 bridges and tunnels across the Yangtze River, including nine bridges and three tunnels in Wuhan.

Rail
The railway from Beijing reached Wuhan in 1905, and was later extended to Guangzhou, becoming the first north-to-south railway mainline to cross China. A number of other lines crossed the province later on, including the Jiaozuo–Liuzhou railway and Beijing–Kowloon railway, respectively, in the western and eastern part of the province.

The first decade of the 21st century has seen a large amount of new railway construction in Hubei. The Wuhan–Guangzhou high-speed railway, roughly parallel to the original Wuhan-Guangzhou line, opened in late 2009, it was subsequently extended to the north, to Beijing becoming the Beijing–Guangzhou high-speed railway. An east-west high-speed corridor connecting major cities along the Yangtze, the Shanghai–Wuhan–Chengdu passenger railway was gradually opened between 2008 and 2012, the Wuhan–Yichang railway section of it opening in 2012. The Wuhan–Xiaogan intercity railway was opened in December 2016 and it was extended when the Wuhan–Shiyan high-speed railway opened in November 2019.

Air
Hubei's main airport is Wuhan Tianhe International Airport. Yichang Sanxia Airport serves the Three Gorges region. There are also passenger airports in Xiangyang, Enshi, and Jingzhou (Shashi Airport, named after the city's Shashi District).

Tourism 
The province's best-known natural attraction (shared with the adjacent Chongqing municipality) is the scenic area of the Three Gorges of the Yangtze. Located in the far west of the province, the gorges can be conveniently visited by one of the numerous tourist boats (or regular passenger boats) that travel up the Yangtze from Yichang through the Three Gorges and into the neighboring Chongqing municipality.

The mountains of western Hubei, in particular in Shennongjia District, offer a welcome respite from Wuhan's and Yichang's summer heat, as well as skiing opportunities in winter. The tourist facilities in that area concentrate around Muyu in the southern part of Shennongjia, the gateway to Shennongjia National Nature Reserve. Closer to the provincial capital, Wuhan, is the Mount Jiugong (Jiugongshan) national park, in Tongshan County near the border with Jiangxi.

A particular important site of both natural and cultural significance is Mount Wudang (Wudangshan) in the northwest of the province. Originally created early in the Ming dynasty, its building complex has been listed by UNESCO since 1994 as a World Heritage Site.

Other historic attractions in Hubei include:
The old Jingzhou City

The Xianling Mausoleum, built by the Ming dynasty Jiajing Emperor for his parents at their fief near Zhongxiang
The Yellow Crane Tower in Wuhan
The Hubei Provincial Museum in Wuhan, with extensive archaeological and cultural exhibits and performance presentations of ancient music and dance. This is one of the best places to learn about the ancient state of Chu, which flourished in the territory of present-day Hubei during the Eastern Zhou dynasty and developed its own unique culture, quite distinct from that of the Shang/Zhou civilization of northern China.

The province also has historical sites connected with China's more recent history, such as the Wuchang Uprising Memorial in Wuhan, Project 131 site (a Cultural-Revolution-era underground military command center) in Xianning, and the National Mining Park in Huangshi.

Sports 

Professional sports teams in Hubei include:

 Wuhan Three Towns F.C. plays in Chinese Super League, the highest level football league in China.

Twinning 
In 2005, Hubei province signed a twinning agreement with Telemark county of Norway, and a "Norway-Hubei Week" was held in 2007.

See also 
 1954 Yangtze River floods
 List of prisons in Hubei
 Major national historical and cultural sites in Hubei
COVID-19 pandemic

Notes

References

Citations

Sources 

 Economic profile for Hubei at HKTDC

External links 

 Hubei Government official website
 Google Maps Hubei

 
.
Provinces of the People's Republic of China